The Jurgens Site is a Paleo-Indian site located near Greeley in Weld County, Colorado.  While the site was used primarily to hunt and butcher bison antiquus, there is evidence that the Paleo-Indians also gathered plants and seeds for food about 7,000 to 7,500 BC.

Geography

History

Paleo-Indian
Paleo-Indians were primarily hunters of large mammals, such as the Bison antiquus, during a transitional period from Ice Age to Ice Age summer.  As the climate warmed, glacial run-off created lakes and savannas.  At the end of the summer period the land became drier, food was not as abundant, and they became extinct.  People adapted by hunting smaller mammals and gathering wild plants to supplement their diet.

The items found at the site were identified as Cody complex culture.  The Cody complex was first identified at a bison antiquus kill site near Cody, Wyoming in 1951.  In addition to the Cody and Jurgens site, other Cody bison kill sites include Green River Basic (WY), Carter/Kerr-McGee (WY) and Frasca (CO).  The sites are distinguished by their campsites, tools and butchering process.  The tools, dated between about 6,000 and 8,000 BC, include Cody knives and Scottsbluff and diamond shaped Eden projectile points.  Shaft abraders, used to straighten spear shafts, were found at the Jurgens Site and a few other Cody complex sites.

According to Noel Justice, the site was inhabited first by people of the Agate Basin Site culture and a second time by people defined as the "Kersey culture".

Bison kill site
Although bison antiquus were dying off as the result of climate changes at the end of the Ice Age, the Jurgens site was evidence of their ability to acquire significant numbers of bison about 7150 B.C.

Archaeology

Artifacts
Artifacts were found in distinct areas within the site:

There was also an area where tools were resharpened or replaced.  In addition to the bison bones at the site, there were also butchered mammal (such as antelope, elk, deer), fish and bird bones.

Tools at the site included:
 63 Kersey lanceolate projectile points, like the Eden projectile points.  The raw material for the points was quartzite, found locally, and Alibates from northern Texas.
 271 utilized and 2,023 debitage flakes
 84 end scrapers
 32 knives, some of which appear to have been fashioned from previous projectile points
 30 ground-stone (anvil, hammerstone, etc.)
 9 bone tools (atlatl hooks, an engraved unla, antler flaking hammer)
 55 stone or mineral items

Excavation and studies

In 1967 Wormington excavated the Frazier site where she found Agate Basin Site (WY) artifacts and bison bones.  Malde was the geologist on the Dent and Frazier sites.

See also
National Register of Historic Places listings in Weld County, Colorado
 List of prehistoric sites in Colorado
Game drive system

Notes

References

Bibliography
 Dixon, E. James. (1999) Bones, Boats & Bison: Archaeology of the first colonization of western North America. University of New Mexico Press. .
 Gibbon, Guy E.; Ames, Kenneth M. Archaeology of Prehistoric Native America: An Encyclopedia.  1998. .
 Griffin-Pierce, Trudy. (2010). The Columbia Guide to American Indians of the Southwest. New York:Columbia University Press. .
 Mandel, Rolfe D. (2000) Geoarchaeology in the Great Plains. Norman, OK: University of Oklahoma Press. 
 Shortt, Mack W. Record of Early People on Yellowstone Lake: Cody Complex Occupation at Osprey Beach Yellowstone Science. 11(4). Retrieved 10-3-2011.
 Zimmerman, Larry J.; Vitelli, Karen D.; Hollowell-Zimmer, Julie. (2003) Ethical Issues in Archaeology. Walnut Creek, CA: AltaMira Press for the Society for American Archaeology. .

Further reading
 Frison, G.C. (1991). Prehistoric Hunters of the High Plains. 2nd. edition. San Diego: Academic Press.
 Wheat, J.B. (1979). The Jurgens Site. Memoir 15. Lincoln: Plains Anthropologist.
 Wheat, J.B. (1978).  Olsen-Chubbuck and Jurgens Sites: Four Aspects of Paleo-Indian Economy.  Plains Anthropologist. 23(82):part 2, 84–89.

Paleo-Indian archaeological sites in Colorado
Archaeological sites on the National Register of Historic Places in Colorado
National Register of Historic Places in Weld County, Colorado